A ramada (shelter) is an open air shelter made of tree branches or thatch. It is typically a shade structure in hot, arid locales.

Ramada may also refer to:

Hotels
 Ramada Worldwide, a hotel chain
 Ramada International, a company that owns, operates, and franchises hotels outside of the United States and Canada
 Ramada Jarvis, a former hotel chain in the United Kingdom

Places
 Ramada, Tunisia, a town in Tunisia
 Ramada (Odivelas), a Portuguese parish in Odivelas municipality
 Cerro Ramada, a mountain in Argentina
 Cordillera de la Ramada, a mountain range of the Andes in Argentina 
 Ramada Norte, a mountain in the Andes Mountains, Argentina
 Nova Ramada, a municipality in the state Rio Grande do Sul, Brazil
 Ramada (neighborhood), a neighborhood of Guaíba, Rio Grande do Sul, Brazil

People
 Daniel Ramada, Uruguayan theologian and diplomat

Music
 Ramada Inn, a song by Neil Young from Psychedelic Pill
 Ramada Inn, a song by Randy Stonehill from Until We Have Wings
 Rrramada, a song by Young Fathers from Tape One

Zoology
 Liza ramada, scientific name of the thinlip mullet, a species of fish in the family Mugilidae